Paraporpidia is a genus of lichenized fungi within the family Lecideaceae.

References

External links
Paraporpidia at Index Fungorum

Lecideales genera
Lichen genera